Raju Abraham (born 30 June 1961) is an Indian politician who represents the Ranni constituency in the Kerala Legislative Assembly.

Abraham belongs to the Communist Party of India (Marxist) which is one of the parties within the Left Democratic Front coalition. He has been elected to the Kerala Legislative Assembly for five consecutive terms: in 1996, 2001, 2006, 2011, and 2016.

Raju Abraham entered politics through his activism in Students' Federation of India. He was the SFI Unit Secretary in M.S. High School, Ranni (1975). He was the Chairman of St. Thomas College, Ranni in 1980 and later the University Union Councillor (1981). He was the president of SFI Pathanamthitta Taluk Committee and a district committee member of SFI in Kollam.

He was elected to CPI(M) Ranni Taluk Committee in 1983. From 1991 onwards, he is working as the district committee member of Pathanamthitta and from 1996 as the district secretariat member. He is also associated with  Centre of Indian Trade Unions. He was the President of Ranni Taluk Quarry Workers Union in 1982 and President of Ranni Taluk Auto, Taxi, Tempo, Lorry Union in 1995. Later he became the President of the Pathanamthitta District Private Motor Workers Union.

References

External links
Article in the Hindu
Bio information on Abraham
Personal website

1961 births
Living people
People from Pathanamthitta
Communist Party of India (Marxist) politicians from Kerala
Kerala MLAs 2016–2021
Malayali politicians
Kerala MLAs 1996–2001
Kerala MLAs 2001–2006
Kerala MLAs 2006–2011
Kerala MLAs 2011–2016